Sevdiye Nilgün Acar (born 1958) is a Turkish miniature artist.

She was born in 1958 and graduated from Şişli High School. She was educated in the art of miniature by her teachers Neşe Aybey and Nilgün Gencer. 

Later she became a teacher at the Miniature Club at Kültür High School and taught there for some time.

She works on large format miniature paintings and has said that she particularly uses gouache, watercolor and gold leaf.

Known exhibitions 

 Boğazın En Güzel Kadını, Sinan Bey 2 (boat) in Aşiyan, (6 March - 14 March) 2016
 Sonradan, Türkiye Gazeteciler Cemiyeti Basın Müzesi Resim Sergisi, (11 April - 26 April) 2016

Sources 

Turkish artists
Turkish women artists
1958 births
Living people